Zafar Imam is a Bangladesh Awami League politician and the former Member of Parliament of Feni-1.

Career
Imam served in the Mukti Bahini and fought in the Battle of Belonia Bulge during the Bangladesh Liberation war. He was awarded Bir Bikram for his role during the war. He commanded the 10th East Bengal Regiment as captain.

Imam was elected to parliament from Feni-1 as an Awami League candidate in 1986. He was re-elected from Feni-1 as a candidate of the Awami League.

Imam contested the 1991 election from Feni-1 as a candidate of the Jatiya Party but lost to Prime Minister Khaleda Zia. The Awami League had nominated Md. Zakaria Bhuiyan who also lost.

Imam contested the 1996 election from Feni-1 as a candidate of the Jatiya Party but came a distant third and for Prime Minister Khaleda Zia won the election.

Imam contested the 2001 election from Feni-1 as a candidate of the Jatiya Party but lost to Prime Minister Khaleda Zia.

References

Awami League politicians
Living people
3rd Jatiya Sangsad members
Mukti Bahini personnel
People from Fulgazi Upazila
1947 births